Melissourgos is a village and a community of the Volvi municipality. Before the 2011 local government reform it was part of the municipality of Apollonia, of which it was a municipal district. The 2011 census recorded 417 inhabitants in the village. The community of Melissourgos covers an area of 22.908 km2.

According to the statistics of Vasil Kanchov ("Macedonia, Ethnography and Statistics"), 160 Greek Christians and 136 Turks lived in the village in 1900.

See also
 List of settlements in the Thessaloniki regional unit

References

Populated places in Thessaloniki (regional unit)